This is a list of canoeists who competed at the 2016 Summer Olympics in Rio de Janeiro, Brazil. Canoeists were competing in 16 canoeing events.

Canoe Slalom

K-1 Men

K-1 Women

C-1 Men

C-2 Men

References

Canoeists at the 2016 Summer Olympics
Canoeing at the 2016 Summer Olympics
Canoe